Sphaeragnostus is an extinct genus from a well-known class of fossil marine arthropods, the trilobites. It can be recognized by having two thorax segments,  a totally effaced headshield (or cephalon), while the tailshield (or pygidium) although effaced, has a clear furrow parallel to its border, and a short, convex, subcircular axis. It lived during the Ordovician (upper Tremadoc to Ashgill).

Taxonomy 
It is difficult to relate Sphaeragnostus to other agnostids, and it is undecided whether this genus should be assigned to the Agnostoidea, the Condylopygoidea, or a new monotypic superfamily.

Distribution 
 S. similaris has been found in the Middle Ordovian of the Czech Republic (Llandeilo of Bohemia, Dobrotivå Formation).
 S. cingulatus is known from the Upper Ordovician of Sweden (Koången, Lindegård near Lund, and Scania, Jerrestad Mudstone Formation), Denmark (Vasegård, Læså, Bornholm, Jerrestad Mudstone), Poland (Brzezinki) and China (Katian of Jiangxi, western Zhejiang and Subei, Gansu).
 S. gaspensis was collected from the Upper Ordovician of Canada (Grande Coupe beds, Percé, Quebec)
 S. nudatus has been excavated from the Upper Ordovician of Kazakhstan (lower Majlisor horizon, Caradoc).

Description 
Like all Agnostida, Sphaeragnostus is diminutive and the cephalon and pygidium are of approximately the same size and outline (or isopygious). Like all Agnostina, Sphaeragnostus has only two thorax segments. The cephalon is externally totally effaced and lacks border furrows, axial furrows, and the glabellar node. The pleural regions of thorax segments are very small, while the axis is very wide (perpendicular to the midline) and remarkably short (along the axis). The pygidium has well-defined border furrows and narrow borders. Axial furrows define a short, broad, convex, subcircular, and unfurrowed axis, that bears both axial and terminal nodes. It lacks a median postaxial furrow. If there are spines on the ”rear corners” of the pygidium, these are minute.

Differences with Leiagnostus 
Cephalons of Sphaeragnostus are extremely effaced and look much like Leiagnostus species. Pygidia of Sphaeragnostus however, differ from other highly effaced genera in a smooth but easily recognizable subcircular axis.

References 

Agnostida genera
Agnostoidea
Ordovician trilobites
Fossils of Canada
Fossils of the Czech Republic
Fossils of Poland
Fossils of Denmark
Fossils of Sweden
Fossils of Kazakhstan
Fossils of China
Paleontology in Quebec
Paleozoic life of Quebec